William Clay (born December 27, 1973) is an American cyclist. He competed in the men's sprint at the 1996 Summer Olympics.

References

External links
 

1973 births
Living people
American male cyclists
Olympic cyclists of the United States
Cyclists at the 1996 Summer Olympics
Sportspeople from Kanagawa Prefecture